The Heidelberg Tun, or Great Heidelberg Tun, is an extremely large wine vat contained within the cellars of Heidelberg Castle. There have been four such barrels in the history of Heidelberg. In 1751, the year of its construction, the present one had a capacity of  221,726 litres (58,574 U.S. gallons). Due to the drying of the wood its current capacity is 219,000 litres (57,854 U.S. gallons). One hundred and thirty oak trees were reputedly used in its construction. It has only rarely been used as a wine barrel, and in fact presently enjoys more use as a tourist attraction, and also as a dance floor since one was constructed on top of the tun.

History

Heidelberg Castle has a history of enormous barrels; today's barrel (Fass) is the fourth in the history of the Neckar town.

 Johann-Casimir-Fass (1591)
 Karl-Ludwig-Fass (1664)
 Karl-Philipp-Fass (1728)
 Karl-Theodor-Fass (1751)

When the French army captured the castle, the soldiers believed the empty wine barrel to be full of wine; their hatchet marks left on the barrel were later visible to tourists.
According to tradition and local legend, the eternal keeper of the enormous Tun remains Perkeo of Heidelberg, once a court jester and master of the castle’s spirit production (and a famously Herculean wine drinker).

The barrel in literature

The Tun is referenced in Rudolf Erich Raspe's The Surprising Adventures of Baron Munchausen,
Jules Verne's novel Five Weeks in a Balloon, Victor Hugo's Les Misérables, Washington Irving's The Specter Bridegroom, Mary Hazelton Wade's Bertha, Mark Twain's A Tramp Abroad and Wilhelm Busch's Die fromme Helena. It can also be found in Herman Melville's Moby-Dick as well as in Lyrisches Intermezzo by Heinrich Heine, later used in the song cycle Dichterliebe by Robert Schumann for the final song "Die alten, bösen Lieder (The old evil songs)". Ezra Pound made reference to the Heidelberg Tun and to the legendary Perkeo in Canto LXXX of The Pisan Cantos (published 1948). The vast but empty vat, purposeless and deprived of its original use, is made to "rhyme" with the emptiness of war and the poet's own need to be filled with human companionship, of which he was deprived while incarcerated in the US Army Detention Center outside Pisa, Italy.  

The English writer Jerome K. Jerome visited it in 1890, during his return trip from Oberammergau:

Anton Praetorius, the first Calvinistic pastor of the parochy of the wine-producing community of Dittelsheim, visited nearby Heidelberg, the centre of Calvin's theology in Germany. Impressed by the immensity of the Johann-Casimir-Fass, he wrote a poem in 1595 praising the barrel as an apparent proof of the superiority of Calvinism, entitled Vas Heidelbergense (Poem on the Great Wine Barrel in the Castle of Heidelberg).

Further reading
 Vas Heidelbergense, Heidelberg, October 1595 (Poem about the 1. Great Wine Barrel in the Castle of Heidelberg. Only one remaining print, translated into German by Burghard Schmanck)
 Stefan Wiltschko, The Big Vat, Heidelberg, 2002 (also available in French, Japanese, Spanish, German)
 Cser, Andreas and Stefan Wiltschko: Das Große Fass im Schloss Heidelberg, Neckargemünd-Dilsberg, 1999
 Das grosse Fass zu Heidelberg ein unbekanntes Kapitel kurpfälzischer Kunstgeschichte, July Sjöberg, editor, Neckargemünd-Dilsberg, 2004
 Hartmut Hegeler und Stefan Wiltschko: Anton Praetorius und das 1. Große Fass von Heidelberg (the 1st Great Wine Barrel in the Castle of Heidelberg) Unna, 2003

References

External links 
 Anton Praetorius and the poem on the 1. Great Wine Barrel in the Castle of Heidelberg (pictures and literature in German)

Buildings and structures in Heidelberg
Wine packaging and storage
Containers
Tourist attractions in Heidelberg

fr:Tonneaux monstres#Les tonneaux d’Heidelberg